Phenasteron is a genus of spiders in the family Zodariidae. It was first described in 2001 by Baehr & Jocqué. , it contains 2 Australian species.

References

Zodariidae
Araneomorphae genera
Spiders of Australia